The Slovene Peasant Revolt took place in 1515 and was the largest peasant revolt in the Slovene Lands. It engulfed most of what is now Slovenia as well as a significant portion of the province of Carinthia, which today is a part of Austria. There were about 80,000 rebels who demanded the reintroduction of the original feudal obligations and trade rights (the so-called "old rights") and a right to decide about the taxes. The spark which started this uprising was when the ethnic German peasants of the Gottschee region killed their lord Jorg von Thurn. They attacked the castles within the region, except in the territory of the County of Görz, where conflicts were solved through negotiations. The revolt was put down by the mercenaries of the Holy Roman Empire, with the deciding battle fought at Celje. The words stara pravda were printed in 1515 in Vienna in a poem of the German mercenaries and were the first printed Slovene words.

References

Slovene
Popular revolt in late-medieval Europe
Peasant revolts
Slovene rebellions
Slovene
16th-century rebellions
16th century in the Holy Roman Empire
History of Celje
16th century in Slovenia
Rebellions in Slovenia